Guofu Zhou is an American economist, currently the Frederick Bierman and James E. Spears Professor of Finance at Olin Business School, Washington University in St. Louis.

References

Year of birth missing (living people)
Living people
Washington University in St. Louis faculty
American economists